Dichomeris adactella is a moth in the family Gelechiidae. It was described by Francis Walker in 1864. It is found in Australia.

Adults are cupreous with white forewings with an interrupted and abbreviated cupreous-white speckled costal stripe. The apical area is cupreous. The hindwings are whitish cinereous (ash grey) towards the base.

References

Moths described in 1864
adactella